Damone Johnson (born March 2, 1962) is a former professional American football tight end in the National Football League (NFL). He played seven seasons for the Los Angeles Rams.

Early life 
Johnson graduated from Santa Monica High School and played collegiately at Cal Poly San Luis Obispo, where he played four seasons and finished with 109 receptions for 1,632 yards and 10 touchdowns.

He earned All-Western Football Conference selection in 1983. After his Cal Poly career in 1984, Johnson ranked second in school history for both receptions and receiving yards.

Professional career 
After being drafted by the Los Angeles Rams in the sixth round of the 1985 NFL Draft, Johnson spent his rookie season on injured reserve due to a knee injury suffered in training camp. In 1986, a shoulder injury kept him sidelined for most of the season before he was activated from injured reserve and played in the team's final five games, though he did not catch a pass. 

Johnson's first significant playing time came when he caught six passes for 69 yards (ultimately both single-game career highs) in the Rams' 30-17 loss to the Cleveland Browns on Monday Night Football. Playing in 12 games and starting in five, Johnson became the Rams' leading pass catcher among tight ends with 21 receptions for 198 yards and two touchdowns. 

Becoming a full-time starter at tight end, Johnson's best season came in 1988, when he caught 42 passes for 350 yards and scored six touchdowns, all single-season highs for his career. In the final game of the regular season that year, Johnson caught four passes for 42 yards and a career-high three touchdowns in a 38-16 win over the eventual Super Bowl champion San Francisco 49ers. Johnson played four more seasons with the Rams, and at the end of his career, he held the record for most touchdown receptions by a tight end in team history.

References

1962 births
Living people
Players of American football from Los Angeles
American football tight ends
Cal Poly Mustangs football players
Los Angeles Rams players